Galearis camtschatica is a species of flowering plants in the orchid family, Orchidaceae, native to Korea, northern Japan, and the Russian Far East (Kuril Islands, Kamchatka, Sakhalin, Khabarovsk Krai).

Taxonomy
The species was first described by Adelbert von Chamisso in 1828, as Orchis camtschatica. It has been placed in a variety of genera, including the monotypic genus Neolindleya. On the basis of molecular phylogenetic studies, in 2014, Neolindleya was subsumed into Galearis, with the species becoming Galearis camtschatica.

References

camtschatica
Flora of Kamchatka Krai
Flora of Khabarovsk Krai
Flora of the Kuril Islands
Flora of Sakhalin
Flora of Japan
Flora of Korea
Orchids of Asia
Plants described in 1828